Gopishantha (26 May 1937 – 10 October 2015), better known by her stage name Manorama was a veteran Indian actress, playback singer and comedian who had appeared in more than 1500 films, 5,000 stage performances and several television series until 2015. She entered the Guinness World Records for acting in more than 1000 films in 1985. By 2015, she had acted in total 780 films." She was a recipient of the Kalaimamani award. In 2002, Government of India awarded manorama with Padma Shri for her contribution to the arts. National Film Award for Best Supporting Actress for her performance in film Pudhiya Padhai (1989) and Filmfare Lifetime Achievement Award – South (1995).

Television 
Kattu Pattti Charitram
Anbulla Amma
Tyagiyin Magal
Vanavil
Aachi International
Anbulla Snehithi
Alli Rajyam
Malargal
Aval
Robo Raja
Manushi
Vaa Vadhyare
Tina Mina
Akkarapacha (Malayalam)
IMSAI Arasigal
Musirama 
Kalyanamam Kalyanam

Films

1950s

1960s

1970s

1980s

1990s

2000s

2010s

See also 
 List of Indian film actresses

References

External links 
 

Indian filmographies
Actress filmographies